Elections for Barking and Dagenham London Borough Council were held on Thursday 4 May 2006. The whole council was up for election.  Barking and Dagenham is split up into 17 wards, each electing 3 councillors, so a total of 51 seats were up for election.

The Labour Party retained control of the council winning 38 seats and 41% of the popular vote. The British National Party won 12 seats in a rare electoral breakthrough for a far-right party, and formed the official opposition winning 17% of the popular vote. The Conservatives won 1 seat.

Background
115 candidates nominated in total. Labour again ran a full slate (51) and was the only party to do so. By contrast the Conservative Party ran only 23 candidates , whilst the Liberal Democrats ran 4 and the BNP ran 13.

Election results

Ward results

Abbey

Alibon

Becontree

Chadwell Heath

Eastbrook

Eastbury

Gascoigne

Goresbrook

Heath

Longbridge

Mayesbrook

Parsloes

River

Thames

Valence

Village

Whalebone

By-elections between 2006 and 2010

Chadwell Heath

The by-election was called following the resignation of Cllr. Sarah Baillie.

References

External links
Barking and Dagenham local council election results

2006
2006 London Borough council elections